Ysgol David Hughes (meaning: David Hughes School) is a bilingual secondary school on Anglesey, Wales. The school building was completed and opened in Menai Bridge in 1963 by Anglesey County Council which, ten years earlier (in 1953), had become the first education authority in the UK to adopt non-selective comprehensive education.

The new school in Menai Bridge catered for all the secondary pupils in South East Anglesey who up to then had been educated four miles away in Beaumaris, the former county town of Anglesey.

History

Beaumaris Grammar School
The Welsh name "Ysgol David Hughes" (David Hughes's School), where "ysgol" is the Welsh for "school", is derived from that of the founder of the original Beaumaris Grammar School established 350 years earlier in the reign of Elizabeth I in 1603. 
Other than by nomenclature however "Ysgol David Hughes" in Menai Bridge has no connection whatever with the original Beaumaris Grammar School or with its founder, David Hughes.

Founder of Beaumaris Grammar School

David Hughes (died 1609), the founder of Beaumaris Grammar School, was born in a stable of Llantrisant, Anglesey. He may have been the David Hughes of county Caernarvon, born 1561, who entered Gray's Inn from Magdalen College, Oxford, 28 January 1583 (Foster, Alumni. Oxon.; Gray's Inn Admission Register, 28 January 1582 – 1583), but another account of him, contained in the papers of Christopher Wase (now held at Corpus Christi College, Oxford) states that he attended Magdalene College, Cambridge. He was appointed 'Tutor to a person of Qualitie who conferred upon him liberal Gratuities & settled upon him a Large Annuitie'. Hughes later lived in Norfolk and used his good fortune to build a 'considerable estate in money which afterwards hee left in his last Will & Testament for the Founding & Endowing of a Free School & Hospitall in & near Bowmaris [sic]'. Settling in Norfolk, he was appointed steward of the manor of Woodrising about 1596. In 1602 he procured a building in Beaumaris which was converted and opened as a Free Grammar School in 1603.

David Hughes's will, dated 30 December 1609, endowed the school and vested its administration in a body of feoffees (trustees) which he specified, should always include the Bishop of Bangor. He also laid down the terms on which "fellowships" (scholarships) should be established to enable deserving pupils to proceed directly from Beaumaris to the University of Oxford. In 1895 the management of the David Hughes charitable endowment (which had funded Beaumaris Grammar School) was transferred from the feoffees to Anglesey's new "County Governing Body" which now used the funds for the establishment of new county schools at Holyhead, Llangefni and Amlwch as well continuing to provide a proportion of funding for Beaumaris Grammar School.

20th-century
In 1953 the ancient Beaumaris Grammar School was combined with Beaumaris Secondary Modern School to become "Beaumaris Comprehensive School" following the Anglesey Council's decision to abolish the tripartite system, becoming the first local education authority to do so. When plans were announced to move the entire school away from Beaumaris to Menai Bridge there was considerable opposition from the people of Beaumaris to what they considered to be the arbitrary closure of their old school and the end of the centuries-old tradition of secondary education in the town.

Facilities
Ysgol David Hughes at Menai Bridge is divided into five blocks, A-D and New Block. It has a new sports hall with a fitness room with views of the Menai Strait and Snowdonia. The facility is open to the public in the evenings.  There are approximately 1250 pupils at the school, from ages 11 to 18.  The school has a large sports reputation and regularly competes against other schools in the area.  The school is located at the top end of Menai Bridge and has views of both the Menai Suspension Bridge and Britannia Bridge.  The school has excellent facilities; classrooms have at least three PCs, every teacher has a laptop or PC and all classrooms have new electronic white boards.  There are laboratories, kitchens and workshops as well as PC rooms in the school. The current headteacher is Mr H Emyr Williams.

The school participates in a broad range of activities and extracurricular activities for pupils. Activities ranging from sports events to science competitions are offered annually for pupils of various ages and interests.

Welsh language 
Welsh Government defines the school as a bilingual secondary school Category 2B, which means that, at least 80% of subjects (excluding Welsh and English) are taught through the medium of Welsh but are also taught through the medium of English. Most pupils received their primary education through the medium of Welsh.

According to the latest Estyn inspection report, approximately 90% of pupils could speak Welsh in 2012.  In 2015, 68.7% of pupils aged 11–15 could speak Welsh fluently, with a further 31% being able to speak Welsh but not to a fluent standard, meaning that 99.7% of pupils in that age range were able to speak Welsh. 40.4% of all pupils spoke Welsh fluently at home as of January 2017.

Notable former pupils

 Tecwyn Roberts, NASA’s first Flight Dynamics Officer and later Director of Networks at Goddard Space Flight Center.
 Matthew Maynard, cricketer
 Aled Jones, singer and presenter
 Carwyn Llŷr, treble singer 
 Louise Elliott, journalist, and TV and radio presenter
 Dafydd Ieuan, musician and member of the Super Furry Animals
 Cian Ciaran, musician and member of the Super Furry Animals
 Arthur Emyr, former Wales Rugby international
 Wayne Hennessey, Wales Football international. 
 Elin Fflur, singer
 Rhun ap Iorwerth, politician and journalist.
 Stuart Andrew, Conservative MP
 Nathan Gill, UKIP MEP, Leader of UKIP Wales.
 Taron Egerton, actor known for his role in the British television series The Smoke and the 2014 action comedy film Kingsman: The Secret Service.
 Howel Harris Hughes, theologian and Principal of the United Theological College in Aberystwyth.
 Huw Garmon, actor 
 Sir Andrew Cahn, former CE of UK Trade and Investment
 Stuart Roy, former Welsh Rugby International and an orthopaedic surgeon.

References

External links
 School Website

Bibliography
David Hughes M.A. and his Free Grammar School at Beaumaris, 1864, reissued (ed. by Vaughan Bowen) 1933
E. Madoc Jones, ‘The Free Grammar School of Beaumaris’ in Trans. Angl. Antiq. Soc., 1922;

Secondary schools in Anglesey
1603 establishments in Wales
Educational institutions established in the 1600s
Menai Bridge